Big Sandy Creek is a stream in Texas, United States. Long sections of the creek pass through the Big Thicket National Preserve. The  Big Sandy Creek unit is named after the stream. The creek also passes through the Alabama-Coushatta Reservation reservation east of Livingston.

Ecology and Wildlife 
Bottomland hardwood forests and beech-magnolia-loblolly slope forests can be found in the stream's floodplain, while pine savannas occupy the adjacent uplands. Common tree species seen in the bottomlands include sweetgum (Liquidambar styraciflua), swamp chestnut oak (Quercus michauxii), hornbeam (Carpinus caroliniana), Hollies (Ilex sp.), and bald cypress (Taxodium distichum). 

Outside of the National Preserve, the Alabama-Coushatta people manage and protect longleaf pine ecosystems on their land.

See also
List of rivers of Texas
Village Creek
Big Thicket

References

USGS Geographic Names Information Service
USGS Hydrologic Unit Map - State of Texas (1974)

Rivers of Texas

Geography of Texas
Rivers of Hardin County, Texas
Rivers of Polk County, Texas